Fiammetta is an Italian feminine given name.

List of people with the given name 

 Fiammetta Baralla (1943–2013), Italian actress
 Fiammetta Cicogna (born 1988), Italian television presenter, actress and model
 Fiammetta Modena (born 1965), Italian politician
 Fiammetta Rossi (born 1995), Italian shooter
 Fiammetta Venner (born 1971), French political scientist, writer and editor
 Fiammetta Wilson (1864–1920), British astronomer

See also 

 Maria d'Aquino, also known as Fiammetta
 Tony Fiammetta, American footballer

Italian feminine given names